Adelly Oliveira Santos (born 8 July 1987 in Londrina) is a Brazilian athlete specialising in the 100 metres hurdles. She represented her country at the 2015 World Championships without advancing from the heats.

Her personal best in the event is 13.06 seconds set in São Bernardo do Campo in 2015.

Competition record

References

1987 births
Living people
Brazilian female hurdlers
World Athletics Championships athletes for Brazil
Athletes (track and field) at the 2015 Pan American Games
Sportspeople from Londrina
Pan American Games athletes for Brazil
People from Paraná (state)
21st-century Brazilian women